A Low Traffic Neighbourhood (LTN) is a scheme implemented to reduce through traffic in residential areas through the use of filtered permeability and traffic calming.

LTNs can be implemented through the use of barriers such as bollards, boom barriers and planters, though can also be implemented virtually through the use of automatic number-plate recognition cameras and road signs, which can allow residential motor access while prohibiting passing motor traffic.

There is evidence to show that LTNs lead to a decrease in car use, increase in walking and cycling and a decrease in street crime, violent crime and sexual assaults.

History 
Prior to the COVID-19 pandemic, there were already at least 25,000 modal filters across the UK. Low-traffic neighbourhoods have been a common policy in designing new towns and communities in the UK since the 1960s. During the COVID-19 pandemic of 2020–21, 72 low-traffic neighbourhoods with modal filters were rolled out under emergency legislation in London, covering a population of around 300,000. Waltham Forest had previously introduced a number of LTNs between 2015 and 2019.

Public opinion 
A study by cycling charity BikeIsBest found that communities in the majority of low-traffic neighbourhoods did not have concerns about the impact of traffic displacement or emergency services.

Traffic 
In London, prior to the Covid-19 pandemic, traffic had risen on side roads by over 100% since 2008. 

People in LTNs are becoming less likely to own a car and more likely to reduce their car usage. In Waltham Forest, a study found that the number of cars and vans fell in mini-Holland areas, particularly in those involving an LTN.

LTNs were implemented in Waltham Forest in 2014. A study by climate charity Possible found that in 2016 on three LTN 'boundary roads' recorded increases of traffic between around 2.6% and 28.3%. Two of the three roads were within the 'normal' range for recent fluctuations in traffic flow. For Sherhall Street, the only road studied that registered an increase, it was found that the 2016 traffic count was around the same as the 2009 traffic count for this road. A study for Transport for London on Walthamstow Village found that after implementation, roads in the Village saw an average 44.1% reduction in traffic. Surrounding roads saw an increase in traffic, most notably Sherhall Street. On Lea Bridge Road, the maximum hourly traffic reduced after the introduction of the scheme and traffic appears more spread out across the day. For buses, the majority of buses through the Village were running very close to normal times. Though bus routes on boundary roads recorded an increase, this was in line with control routes across the borough.

A 2022 study studied three LTNs in Islington Borough between July 2019 and February 2021. It found a statistically significant decrease in traffic 58.2% compared with control sites in the same area. A smaller, statistically insignificiant decrease of 13.4% was found on boundary sites.

Pollution and health 
A 2022 study studied three LTNs in Islington Borough between July 2019 and February 2021. It found that LTNs had reducced NO2 by 5.7% on internal sites, and by 8.9% on boundary sites.

Crime and safety 
The introduction of LTNs leads to a decrease in total street crime, increasing with duration since implementation, and with no displacement to other areas. After 3 years of implementation, a study found an 18% decrease in street crime in LTN areas. A larger reduction was found for violent crimes and sexual assaults. Only a single subcategory for crime saw an increase – bicycle theft.

Evidence suggests that LTNs lead to a three-fold reduction in injuries within LTN areas. Meanwhile, no evidence suggests that injury numbers change on boundary roads.

In Tower Hamlets Lutfur Rahman was urged by the Metropolitan Police not to dismantle a Low-Traffic Neighbourhood in Bethnal Green, reflecting concerns that removing it would lead to an increase in crime.

Active travel 
LTNs tend to encourage more active travel, shifting people from car use of these modes. Emergency rapid-implemented LTNs see more walking, cycling and improved perceptions of the local cycling environment.

Emergency vehicles 
A 2020 study of the impact of the Waltham Forest LTN in London found no evidence that fire brigade emergency response times were affected inside LTNs and some evidence that they improved slightly on boundary roads, despite a perception among fire crews that traffic calming was the cause of some delays. A 2021 study in Findings journal examined the impact of 72 LTNs in London on fire brigade emergency response times. It found no evidence that response times were affected for both LTNs that use physical barriers and those that use camera enforcement.

Equity 
LTN implementation since 2020 in London has been broadly equitable at the city and micro levels. The most deprived quarter are more likely to live in a newly opened LTN than people in the least deprived quarter. Ethnic minorities are more likely to live in a newly opened LTN than White people. London Boroughs have, on average, implemented LTNs in their most deprived districts.

Critics of LTNs also include green campaigners such as John Stewart and Rosamund Kissi-Debrah.  Stewart has argued that LTNs are "inherently unfair" because "in most cases they simply displace traffic and pollution to the adjacent main and boundary roads", while Kissi-Debrah also frames the problem in terms of social justice: she argues that affluent neighborhoods are more likely to benefit from traffic reduction and more-deprived areas more likely to suffer from the traffic displacement and added pollution.

Controversy 

Modal filters and low-traffic neighbourhoods have sometimes been criticised for a number of reasons. The British motoring magazine Auto Express criticised the schemes for their levels of cost, calling them a "waste of money". Other criticisms include high fines and a lack of consultation in implementing the scheme.

In the UK, the implementation of low-traffic neighbourhoods has been compared to Brexit in its divisiveness and campaigns against LTNs have been closely associated with the far right and conspiracy theorists. The schemes have caused protests in multiple cities by anti-LTN activists. The former actor Laurence Fox, who ran for Greater London Mayor in 2021, wanted to remove all modal filtering (even those in place before 2020) in London. On this platform, Fox received just 1.9% of first round votes. In Hackney, a candidate standing on an anti-LTN platform in a by-election in Hoxton East and Shoreditch in May 2021 received fewer than 8% of votes, while in a by-election in St Peter's Ward in Islington an anti-LTN candidate received only 318 out of 4,395 of votes (7.2%).

See also 
School Streets
Rat running

References 

Traffic calming
Road transport
Transportation planning